James R. Herndon (July 2, 1892 – December 16, 1983), known also as Sweet Evening Breeze, Miss Sweets, or Sweets, was an American drag queen. She was one of Lexington, Kentucky's first notable drag queens and is credited with promoting the city's early drag scene and culture. Born in Scott County, Kentucky on July 2, 1892, Herndon moved to Lexington when he was a child and was left by his uncle at the city's Good Samaritan Hospital. Herndon spent much of his childhood here, before eventually working his way up to the position of head orderly at the same hospital.

In the 1960s, Sweets, along with a teenage fellow aspiring drag artist, were arrested in downtown Lexington under violation of the city's cross-dressing ordinance, which prohibited men in particular from donning women's clothes and/or makeup. As both a gay and black man this was not uncommon, as upwards of two-thirds of sodomy and cross-dressing arrests in Kentucky were charged against black men. Sodomy Laws in Kentucky were deemed unconstitutional by the Kentucky Supreme Court in Kentucky v. Wasson (1992), and the introduction of the Fayette County-wide Fairness Ordinance (1999) signified changes toward ending other forms of LGBTQ+ discrimination.

Legacy 
Jeffery Alan Jones, LGBTQ+ scholar, notes that "Sweets was visible within white [Lexingtonian] society in few ways that African Americans of the period could be." Sweets frequently hosted and entertained in his Prall St. home in Lexington, and made regular appearances, as a cheerleader in uniform, at University of Kentucky football games, as well as other events. In 2017, local author and historian, John Coleman, spoke on the legacy of James "Sweet Evening Breeze" Herndon during a hosted event at the Lexington Public Library, the proceeds from ticket sales of which went towards funding the Moveable Feast organization in Lexington, KY, which prioritizes getting cooked meals to people living with HIV/AIDS among other illnesses and disabilities. Similarly, in Herndon's lifetime, he channeled extensive funds and resources from himself and events back into Lexington's black and LGBTQ+ communities.

Sweets died in 1983 at the Homestead Nursing Center, and is buried at the Lexington Cemetery.

Herndon's life and experiences are also recorded and featured in a 2013 documentary film, Last Gospel of the Pagan Babies, by Jean Donohue.

References 

1892 births
1983 deaths
African-American drag queens
LGBT African Americans
LGBT people from Kentucky
People from Scott County, Kentucky